Honganoor  is a village in the southern state of Karnataka, India. It is located in the Chamarajanagar taluk of Chamarajanagar district in Karnataka.

Demographics
 India census, Honganoor had a population of 6757 with 3426 males and 3331 females.

See also
 Chamarajanagar
 Districts of Karnataka

References

External links
 http://Chamarajanagar.nic.in/

Villages in Chamarajanagar district